During the 1996–97 English football season, Hull City A.F.C. competed in the Football League Third Division.

Season summary
A ten match unbeaten league run at the beginning of the 1996–97 season saw Hull remain in the top six until the beginning of October, but the side drifted towards a mid table placing by Christmas. The Tigers progressed through to the second round of the FA Cup following an extraordinary first round replay against Whitby Town. Duane Darby scored a double hat-trick in Hull's 8–4 victory.

Their league form was less impressive, and Hull finished in 17th place – their lowest ever position. The campaign was played out amid growing unrest from the dwindling support. The abuse generated against Dolan and chairman Martin Fish led Christopher Needler – son of the former chairman – to sell his major shareholding.

In July 1997, the Needler family's ownership of the club was at an end. David Lloyd, captain of the Great Britain Davis Cup tennis team and a multi-millionaire, was the new Hull City owner. He also acquired the Hull Rugby League club and ran the two in a joint operation.

Final league table

Results
Hull City's score comes first

Legend

Football League Third Division

FA Cup

League Cup

Football League Trophy

Squad

References

Hull City A.F.C. seasons
Hull City
1990s in Kingston upon Hull